Volbu is a village in Øystre Slidre Municipality in Innlandet county, Norway. The village is located on a hillside between the lakes Heggefjorden and Volbufjorden. Volbu Church is located in this village.

References

Øystre Slidre
Villages in Innlandet